The 1976 United States presidential election in the District of Columbia took place on November 2, 1976, as part of the 1976 United States presidential election in order to select the District of Columbia's three electoral votes for President of the United States. Democrat Jimmy Carter won the District by an overwhelming margin.

See also
 United States presidential elections in the District of Columbia

References

Washington, D.C.
1976
United States presidential